Adams Township is a township in Miner County, South Dakota, United States.

References

Townships in Miner County, South Dakota
Townships in South Dakota